Ndoc Martini (17 January 1880 – 6 December 1916) was an Albanian painter.

Life
Martini was born in Shkodër, north Albania, then in the Ottoman Empire. He was a Roman Catholic. He took his first lessons from Kolë Idromeno in his home town at the School of Arts and Crafts. From 1904 to 1907 he lived in Calabria, Italy based on a scholarship from the "Scuola Normale nel Collegio Italo-Albanese di San Demetrio Corone".
After that he studied at the Académie des Beaux-Arts in Paris. He had to interrupt the studies because of financial issues, but kept working as a painter in the Pensi studio. In 1913 he started suffering from tuberculosis and died in 1916 in a sanatorium in Paris.

References

Sources and external links
 Piktori Ndoc Martini, jeta dhe veprat e tij 

1880 births
1916 deaths
People from Shkodër
People from Scutari vilayet
19th-century Albanian painters
Albanian male painters
20th-century Albanian painters